Klara Grahn (born 21 March 1996) is a Swedish football defender currently playing for Piteå IF in the Damallsvenskan.

References

External links
  
  (archive)
 

1996 births
Living people
Swedish women's footballers
Damallsvenskan players
Piteå IF (women) players
Women's association football defenders